Antony Thomas Sweeney (born 5 September 1983) is an English former professional footballer who played as a midfielder. He played in the Football League for Hartlepool United and Carlisle United. He is a first team coach at Hartlepool United.
 
In thirteen seasons with Hartlepool, he made 444 appearances, making him the third highest appearance maker in the club's history. During his time there he won the player of the year award for the 2010–11 season and won two promotions out of the fourth tier. He left the club in 2014 for Carlisle United where he spent two seasons before joining National League side Gateshead. After retiring in 2016, he worked with Hartlepool's youth team before becoming a first team coach.

Career

Hartlepool United

Antony Sweeney was born in Stockton-on-Tees. He joined Hartlepool's Youth Development programme, the same programme that developed players such as Adam Boyd and Jim Provett into first team regulars. He established himself as a hot prospect whilst in the youth team and was offered a permanent contract under Chris Turner.

In the 2001–02 season, Sweeney made his debut in the 3–0 win over York City after coming on as a substitute. On the first day of the following season, Sweeney made his first Hartlepool start in the 3–1 win over Carlisle United. However, despite his potential Sweeney found it difficult to establish himself as permanent fixture in the team and spent the majority of the following two seasons in the reserves.

However towards the end of the 2003–04 season, Sweeney was given a chance to cement his place in the first team due to injuries. Soon after, Sweeney quickly scored his first goal against former manager Mike Newell's Luton Town. Sweeney's second goal for the club gained him even more recognition as it was in the second leg of the play-off semi-final against Bristol City.

Sweeney's next season would prove to be even more action-packed as he played in 44 of Hartlepool's 46 league matches. He received his first red card against Milton Keynes Dons after a tussle with Izale McLeod but he more than made up for it when he scored his first hat-trick against Chesterfield in his next appearance. Sweeney's deceiving runs from midfield enabled him to get in behind opposition defences and this helped him to notch up 12 goals for the season, making him Hartlepool's highest scoring midfield player. This made him one of the front-runners for both Hartlepool's Fans' and Players' Player of the Year, but he missed out to Joel Porter and Adam Boyd respectively. Sweeney would start in the 2005 Football League One play-off final as Hartlepool were defeated in extra-time to Sheffield Wednesday.

Sweeney demonstrated his versatility by spending much of the 2009–10 season playing in an unfamiliar right-back role. In both the 2010–11 and 2011–12 seasons he prospered in his regular position of central midfield, top scoring in both campaigns with nine and eight goals respectively. Ahead of the 2013–14 season, Sweeney was named as Hartlepool's new club captain but struggled for game time. Sweeney left at the end of the 2013–14 season having made 444 appearances in his thirteen years at the club. This placed him third in the all time appearances rankings.

Carlisle United
On 20 June 2014, Sweeney signed a two-year deal with League Two side Carlisle United following their relegation from League One.

Sweeney was released at the end of his two years and signed for Gateshead. He made 58 appearances in all competitions for The Cumbrians.

Gateshead
Sweeney made one appearance for Gateshead, as a substitute in a 0–1 defeat at Forest Green Rovers before leaving to join previous club Hartlepool United as a coach.

Coaching career
Sweeney holds a UEFA A Licence qualification. In 2016, Sweeney began coaching Hartlepool United U16's part-time while playing for Gateshead. After retiring from professional football in September 2016, Sweeney took up a full-time role at Hartlepool as Youth Development Coach.

In January 2019, Sweeney began coaching Hartlepool's first team as a part of Craig Hignett's backroom staff. Following the departure of first team manager Craig Hignett, Sweeney was appointed caretaker manager at Hartlepool in October 2019. Sweeney returned to his previous role as First Team Coach when Dave Challinor was appointed Pools manager in November 2019.

Sweeney was appointed Interim Manager after Dave Challinor left the club to join Stockport County in November 2021. He won his first game in charge, a 1–0 win against Everton U21s in the EFL Trophy. He finished his second spell in charge with a 3–0 win against Sheffield Wednesday in the EFL Trophy.

On 2 March 2022, Sweeney signed a long term contract with the club. The deal would see him to continue to work with the Hartlepool first team while also helping to re-develop the club's academy.

Recognition
Sweeney won Hartlepool's Fan and Player's Player of the Year award for the 2010–11 season. In March 2022, at the annual North East Football Writers Association Awards, Sweeney received the prestigious John Fotheringham Award which goes to someone who has made a significant contribution to football in the North East.

Career statistics

Managerial statistics

Honours
Hartlepool United
Football League Third Division runner-up: 2002–03
Football League Two runner-up: 2006–07

Individual
Hartlepool United Fans' Player of the Year: 2010–11
Hartlepool United Players' Player of the Year: 2010–11

References

External links

1983 births
Living people
Footballers from Stockton-on-Tees
Footballers from County Durham
English footballers
Association football midfielders
Hartlepool United F.C. players
Carlisle United F.C. players
Gateshead F.C. players
English Football League players
National League (English football) players
English football managers
Hartlepool United F.C. non-playing staff
Hartlepool United F.C. managers
National League (English football) managers